The Pakistan Academy of Letters (PAL) is a national academy with its main focus on Pakistani literature and related fields. It is the largest and the most prestigious learned society of its kind in Pakistan, with activities throughout the nation. It was established in July 1976 by a group of renowned Pakistani writers, poets, essayists, playwrights, and translators, inspired by the Académie Française.

PAL as a government institution
After its founding in 1976, Pakistan Academy of Letters remains a government-sponsored institution. It works under the jurisdiction of Ministry of Information, Broadcasting and National Heritage (Pakistan).

The poet Ahmed Faraz was appointed its first Director. It is an autonomous non-profit organisation, supervised by its own Board of Governors,  receiving support from the Government of Pakistan as the apex national institution.

The Academy maintains several regional offices, and links with other national and international organizations of a similar status. Its agenda includes promotion of literary education, publication and documentation.   with a view to promoting and fostering Pakistani literature, literary activities in Pakistan, and systematizing the support mechanism to writers and scholars of Urdu, Punjabi, Saraiki, Sindhi, Pushto, Balochi, English and other Pakistani languages.

PAL's founding fellows
In 1978,  Ishtiaq Hussain Qureshi became the first Chairman of its Founding Fellows, among whom were prominent 'men of letters' representing different languages of Pakistan: 
 Ishtiaq Hussain Qureshi (history) (first chairman)
 A. K. Brohi (philosophy)
 Hafeez Jalandhri (Urdu language)
 Syed Abdullah (Urdu language)
 Ahsan Danish (Urdu language)
 Ahmed Nadeem Qasmi (Urdu language)
 Shareef Kunjahi (Punjabi language)
 Nabi Bakhsh Khan Baloch (Sindhi language)
 Syed Rasool Rasa (Pashto language)
 Sardar Khan Gashkori (Balochi language)
 Professor Ahmed Ali (writer) (English language)

Board of Governors appointed in 1978

First Board of Governors
 Ishtiaq Hussain Qureshi (first chairman)
 Ashfaq Ahmad
 Abul Khair Kashfi
 Pareshan Khattak
 Syed Mujtaba Hussain 
 Two representatives from the Ministry of Education
 One representative from the Universities Grants Commission (now the Higher Education Commission of Pakistan)

Pakistan Academy of Letters was established in 1976 but its Board of Governors were not officially appointed by the Government of Pakistan until 1978, when its objectives and functions were also determined.

Academy's support for the writers
The Pakistan Academy of Letters gives annual awards called National Literary Awards for the best original books (within the literary and critical categories) written in all the major languages of Pakistan. The award recipients were initially given a cash prize of Rupees 100,000 (increased to Rs200,000 by 2016).

In 1980,  Shafiq-ur-Rehman was appointed the Academy's first Chairman. He has been followed in this fixed-tenure position by a number of writers.

From time to time, the Academy nominates Fellows, and more restrictively some Life Fellows, who earn the privilege of using the post-nominal letters FPAL. The Fellowship of the Academy is highly selective, indicating high distinction in the respective field, and is only awarded to those who are recognized to have contributed extraordinary work to enrich the creation and understanding of Pakistani literature.

Launch of lifetime achievement awards
The Kamal-e-Fun Award (Lifetime Achievement Award) was launched in 1997 by the academy in the field of literature for recognition of creative and research work done by individuals. It also initially carried a cash award of Rupees 500,000 (increased to Rupees 1 million by 2016). Starting in 1997, it was  conferred on fourteen people by the end of 2010. A jury comprising Pakistan's eminent literary figures announces, after careful consideration, the name of the yearly award recipient. This award is considered to be Pakistan's highest literary award.

Commemorative postage stamp issued for the academy
On 24 September 2003, Pakistan Postal Services issued a commemorative postage stamp on the 25th anniversary of the academy's 'official founding' in 1978.

Recent developments
In 2020, Pakistan Academy of Letters inaugurated 'Faiz Ahmed Faiz Auditorium' on Faiz Ahmed Faiz's birthday with the poet's daughters Muneeza Hashmi, Salima Hashmi and noted scholar Iftikhar Arif in attendance. Federal Minister of Education Shafqat Mahmood also spoke on the occasion.

References

External links

Learned societies of Pakistan
Pakistani writers' organisations
National academies
1976 establishments in Pakistan
Government agencies established in 1976